Galingale may refer to:

 Galangal, one of several plants in the ginger family with aromatic rhizomes used for food and medicines
 Galingale, any of several species of Cyperus sedges with aromatic rhizomes, especially:
 Cyperus longus